Sailing has been a sport of the Pan American Games since the inaugural 1951 Pan American Games, being contested in every edition, except for the 1955 edition.

Medal table
1951-2019

Notes
At the 1959 edition, Barton Kirkconell from Jamaica and Rawle Barrow from Trinidad and Tobago earned, together, a bronze medal at the Flyting Dutchman class. The medal is credited to the West Indies Federation.

See also
  (1959 – 1975)

References

 
Sports at the Pan American Games
Pan American Games